Lin-7 homolog C is a protein that in humans is encoded by the LIN7C gene.

Interactions 

LIN7C has been shown to interact with:
 DLG1,
 KCNJ12, and
 KCNJ4.

References

Further reading